Yuan Shoufang, born March 1939 in Jilin City, Jilin), is a General and Director of the General Political Department of the People's Liberation Army of China.

References

1939 births
Living people
People's Liberation Army generals from Jilin
People from Jilin City
Date of birth missing (living people)
20th-century Chinese military personnel
Alternate members of the 15th Central Committee of the Chinese Communist Party
Alternate members of the 16th Central Committee of the Chinese Communist Party